The Anglo-Persian Agreement involved Great Britain and Persia, and centered on the drilling rights of the Anglo-Persian Oil Company. The "agreement" was issued by British Foreign Secretary, Lord Curzon, to the Persian government in August 1919. It was never ratified by the Majlis (Iranian parliament).

After the 1917 Bolshevik Revolution, the new Soviet government abandoned the former Russian sphere of influence in the five northern provinces of Iran, branding the concept as "Tsarist Imperialism". Britain was the remaining power in the region and Curzon hoped to make Iran not a protectorate but a client state of Britain and of no other great power.

The document gave a guarantee of British access to all Iranian oil fields. In return the British would:

Supply munitions and equipment for a British-trained army
Provide a 2 million sterling loan for "necessary reforms"
Revise the Customs tariff
Survey and build railroads.

The document was criticized by foreign observers as hegemonic, especially in the United States, which also had designs on accessing Iranian oil fields. Eventually, the Anglo-Persian Agreement was formally denounced by the Majlis on 22 June 1921.

See also
Anglo-Russian Convention of 1907

External links
 
Haghshenas, Seyyed Ali, review of Treaty of 1919, between Iran & Britain. (owjnews Agency)

1919 in Iran
Treaties of the United Kingdom (1801–1922)
Interwar-period treaties
Treaties concluded in 1919
Treaties of the Qajar dynasty
Anglo-Persian Oil Company
Iran–United Kingdom relations
Bilateral treaties of the United Kingdom
Bilateral treaties of Iran
Neocolonialism